Rizal sa Dapitan is a 1997 Philippine biographical film directed by Tikoy Aguiluz about the four-year exile of Filipino propagandist and patriot José Rizal in Dapitan, starring Albert Martinez as Rizal and Amanda Page as Josephine Bracken. The screenplay was written by Pete Lacaba.

Plot
José Rizal (Martinez) was exiled in Dapitan in 1892, and he began adapting to his new home. He helped the local residents by offering free education to all children, befriending his student Jose Asiniero (Hernando), and rendering his services as a doctor, including treating his mother, Doña Teodora Alonzo (Carpio), who visited him with his sisters Maria (Pangilinan) and
Narcisa (Dumpit).

He met his fiancée Josephine Bracken (Page) who brought her blinded stepfather George Taufer (Holmes) but later on she left him for her beloved Rizal. They decide to marry, but are refused a Church wedding on political grounds. The couple settles for a common-law marriage despite initial opposition from Rizal's family, and have a stillborn son Rizal names Francisco. The film closes with Rizal leaving Dapitan as the locals mourn him. An epilogue explains Rizal's intent to work in Cuba and subsequent arrest, his execution and its birthing the Philippine Revolution.

Cast
 Albert Martinez as Dr. José Rizal
 Amanda Page as Josephine Bracken
 Roy Alvarez as Capt. Ricardo Carnicero
 Jaime Fabregas as Fr. Francisco Paula de Sanchez
 Candy Pangilinan as Maria Rizal
 Tess Dumpit as Narcisa Rizal
 Rustica Carpio as Teodora Alonso Realonda
 Noni Buencamino as Pío Valenzuela
 Carelle Manuela as Manuela Orlac
 Soliman Cruz as Pablo Mercado
 Junell Hernando as Jose "Josielito" D. Aseniero (student of Rizal and later governor of Zamboanga del Norte)
 Chris Michelena as Fr. Obach
 Paul Holmes as George Tauffer

Production

Development
Antonio Samson, then the senior vice president of PLDT, came up with the idea of making a film about the time José Rizal was exiled in Dapitan, and brought it to director Tikoy Aguiluz.

Production
The film was shot entirely in the City of Dapitan, Zamboanga del Norte on 16 mm film. Up to June 1997, the film was simply titled Dapitan. Aguiluz originally meant for the film to have a shorter length for release on television, but he eventually decided against it, convincing the producers to let him extend it to feature-length.

See also
José Rizal (film)
Bayaning 3rd World

References

External links

1997 films
Cultural depictions of José Rizal
José Rizal
Philippine biographical films